The terms horse race and handicapping the horse race, have been used to describe media coverage of elections. The terms refer to any news story or article whose main focus is describing how a particular candidate or candidates is faring during the election, in other words, trying to predict the outcome. This category includes polls. There is a thin line between a horse race news story and a non horse race news story. For example, an article simply describing a candidate's economic policy is a non horse race article, but an article which is about how certain groups of voters are angry at a candidate's economic policy is a horse race article.

Criticisms of horse race coverage
Critics of the news media say that the vast majority of all articles during a political election are horse race style. Different criticisms have been raised as to why that is bad:

It is argued that news sources tend to use horse race journalism as a ploy to lure in audiences and tighten polls during election cycles by discrediting candidates favored to win and hyping underdogs
Horse race coverage is considered by some to cause voters to change their actual perceptions on a candidate in a sort of vicious cycle. For example, a poll showing a third party candidate having a low support percentage may discourage other people from voting for that person so as to avoid the spoiler effect. That effect is magnified if a particular media outlet has a biased point of view that they want to get across. One way that a biased news outlet would use this technique is similar to the "some say" rhetorical device, namely by making uncited references to constituent outrage or support of some particular issue.
Some say that horse race coverage destroys coverage of the issues, because often, an article is mostly about how groups reacted to a speech or other presentation of a candidate on an issue and has little room to discuss the candidate's point of view itself.
A horse race style of article allows for the use of weasel words: a subtle way of editorializing on the part of the author by focusing on the criticisms or praise of an anonymous or small group of voters.
It is argued that horse race coverage distracts voters from issues surrounding candidates by emphasizing poll results, regardless of how reliable the polls may be.

See also
Pollster
Swingometer

External links
 Political Glossary: Horse Race
In Defense of (the Right Kind of) Horse Race Journalism
Hyping The Horse Race

Political terminology
Journalism terminology